Michael Griffiths (born 18 March 1962) is a former Welsh rugby union player and British Lion, currently coaching Ystrad Rhondda RFC in the Welsh Rugby Union Division 2 East. He plied his trade with Pontypridd RFC between 1997 and 2003, making 73 appearances.

Griffiths's father is George Griffiths, a builder, and his mother is Joy Griffiths. He has two sons, Joel Michael and Luc Rhys. They both play for Ystrad Rhondda RFC.

External links
Pontypridd RFC profile
Wasps profile

Notes

1962 births
Living people
Barbarian F.C. players
Bridgend RFC players
British & Irish Lions rugby union players from Wales
Cardiff RFC players
Pontypridd RFC players
Rugby union players from Clydach Vale
Wales international rugby union players
Wasps RFC players
Welsh rugby union coaches
Welsh rugby union players